Sandra Bromley  is a Canadian artist. She is noted for her anti-war and anti-violence artwork, most notably Gun Sculpture, co-created with Wallis Kendal. Her artwork has been exhibited at the United Nations and the presentation of the Nobel Peace Prize.

Bromley earned her BFA in 1979 from the University of Alberta. In 1997, she co-founded  with Kendal, a non-profit group that works with at-risk youth in Edmonton.  She was inducted into the Royal Canadian Academy of Arts in 2012, receiving the Queen's Jubilee Medal the same year.

The Art of Peacemaking: The Gun Sculpture 
Bromley and collaborator Wallis Kendal co-created The Gun Sculpture, a five-tonne sculpture that was unveiled in Edmonton in early 2000. The Canadian Millennium Bureau and the UN Department for Disarmament Affairs provided funding, as well as private donations. Composed of 7,000 deactivated weapons such as landmines, machine-guns and knives donated to the artists by Canadian and international sources, the walk-in structure resembles a prison cell. The sculpture is paired with multimedia components depicting victims of war, and crimes of violence like domestic abuse. As described by a UN report on small arms, the sculpture contributes to "an understanding of the ways in which civilians including children [are] affected by such weapons". Its effect is to "force us to think about violence" and "what we can do to contribute to the culture of peace."

Since its debut, the work has been toured around the world including the Expo 2000 world's fair in Hanover, Germany, the Headquarters of the United Nations in New York City, the Canadian War Museum in Ottawa, and the Nobel Peace Prize Centennial Celebration in Seoul, South Korea.

External links
 Official website of Sandra Bromley
 The Gun Sculpture
 iHuman Youth Society

References

21st-century Canadian artists
21st-century Canadian women artists
Canadian anti-war activists
Artists from Alberta
Canadian multimedia artists
Canadian sculptors
University of Alberta alumni
Living people
Year of birth missing (living people)
Members of the Royal Canadian Academy of Arts